Aran Media Works  is an Indian film production company established by Nara Rohit, Sree Vishnu, and Krishna Vijay.

Film production

References

External links
 Aran Media Works  on Facebook

Film production companies based in Hyderabad, India
Year of establishment missing